David Henry Peter Maybury-Lewis (5 May 1929 – 2 December 2007) was a British anthropologist, ethnologist of lowland South America, activist for indigenous peoples' human rights, and professor emeritus of Harvard University.

Born in Hyderabad, Sindh (now in Pakistan), Maybury-Lewis attended the University of Oxford, at which he earned a Doctor of Philosophy degree. In 1960, he joined the Harvard faculty, and was Edward C. Henderson Professor of Anthropology there from 1966 until he retired in 2004. His extensive ethnographic fieldwork was conducted primarily among indigenous peoples in central Brazil, which culminated in his ethnography among the Xavante, as well as post-modernist renditions. In 1972, he co-founded with his wife Pia Cultural Survival, the leading US-based advocacy and documentation organization devoted to "promoting the rights, voices and visions of indigenous peoples."

Awards 
 Former president of the American Ethnological Society
 Elected fellow of the American Academy of Arts and Sciences, in 1977
 Grand Cross of the Brazilian Order of Scientific Merit, Brazil's highest academic honor, in 1997
 Anders Retzius gold medal of the Swedish Society for Anthropology and Geography, in 1998

Selected bibliography 
Akwẽ-Shavante Society (1974) 
Dialectical Societies: The Ge and Bororo of Central Brazil (1979) 
Prospects for Plural Societies: 1982 Proceedings of the American Ethnological Society (1984) 
The Attraction of Opposites: Thought and Society in the Dualistic Mode (1989) 
Millennium: Tribal Wisdom and the Modern World (1992) 
The Savage and the Innocent (2000) 
Indigenous Peoples, Ethnic Groups, and the State (2001) 
The Politics of Ethnicity:Indigenous Peoples in Latin American States (2003)

External links 
 Biography
 Cultural Survival
 Prins, Harald E.L., and Graham, Laura. 2008. “Pioneer in Brazilian Ethnography & Indigenous Rights Advocacy: David Maybury-Lewis (1929-2007).” Tipití: Journal of the Society for the Anthropology of Lowland South America, Vol.6 (No.1-2), pp. 115–22. 

1929 births
2007 deaths
Social anthropologists
Ethnologists
Latin Americanists
Harvard University faculty
Recipients of the Great Cross of the National Order of Scientific Merit (Brazil)
Indigenous rights activists
Non-fiction environmental writers
Fellows of the American Academy of Arts and Sciences
Brazilianists